John Joseph Eagan (January 22, 1872 – June 13, 1956) was an American Democratic Party politician who represented New Jersey's 11th congressional district in the United States House of Representatives from 1913 to 1921.

Biography
Born in Hoboken, New Jersey to Irish immigrant parents, he graduated from public, parochial, and private schools. In 1894, he founded and was president of the Eagan Schools of Business in Hoboken, Union Hill, and Hackensack, New Jersey and Brooklyn. He was the first vice president of the Merchants & Manufacturers' Trust Co. and collector of taxes of Union Township, Union County, New Jersey 1896–1899.

Eagan was elected as a Democrat to the Sixty-third and to the three succeeding Congresses (March 4, 1913 – March 3, 1921). He was a delegate to the 1920 Democratic National Convention at San Francisco, California. He was an unsuccessful candidate for reelection in 1920 to the Sixty-seventh Congress. He was again elected to the Sixty-eighth Congress (March 4, 1923 – March 3, 1925) but was an unsuccessful candidate for renomination in 1924.

After Congress, Eagan resumed his former business pursuits. He served as a member and president of the Board of Education, Weehawken, New Jersey 1932-1940 and was appointed collector of taxes and custodian of school moneys of Weehawken in 1940 and collector of taxes 1941–1955. He resided in Weehawken until his death in Paramus, New Jersey in 1956 and was buried Tillson, New York.

References

Inline citations

General references

1872 births
1956 deaths
American people of Irish descent
Politicians from Hoboken, New Jersey
People from Weehawken, New Jersey
Democratic Party members of the United States House of Representatives from New Jersey
School board members in New Jersey